Nathan Peabody Ames ( – )  was an American manufacturer and entrepreneur.  With his younger brother, he founded the Ames Manufacturing Company. 

Ames began business in Chicopee Falls (now called Chicopee), Massachusetts, where he opened a cutlery shop in 1829. He became known as a skillful sword-maker, furnishing large numbers by contract to the U. S. government. His business having increased, he removed to Cabotville, Mass., and with his associates incorporated in 1834 the Ames Manufacturing Company. In 1836 the works were supplemented by the addition of a foundry for casting bronze cannon and church-bells. This establishment soon became famous, and furnished most of the brass cannon for the U. S. army. The statues of De Witt Clinton, in Greenwood Cemetery, Brooklyn, N. Y., of Washington, in Union Square, New York, and of Franklin, in School Street, Boston, Mass., were cast at this foundry. In 1840  Ames visited Europe for the purpose of inspecting the various armories and of acquiring the latest information in regard to improved processes. In 1844 he received an important order from the British government for machines used in the manufacture of muskets.

Nathan Peabody Ames died on 3 April 1847 in Chicopee. Chicopee would become a separate town, partitioned from Springfield, Massachusetts in 1852, 5 years after his death.

References

Created via preloaddraft
1803 births
1847 deaths
American blacksmiths
American manufacturing businesspeople
People from Chicopee, Massachusetts
People from Lowell, Massachusetts
Swordsmiths